Andrew Spencer Winston (born 1946) is a psychologist and historian who is an emeritus professor at the University of Guelph in Canada. He is known for his research on the history of scientific racism and eugenics in psychology. He was president of the Society for the History of Psychology (Division 26 of the American Psychological Association) in 2012, and served as Executive Officer to Cheiron: The International Society for the History of Behavioral and Social Sciences from 2002 to 2008.

Winston has been critical of right libertarian thinkers such as Murray Rothbard, Charles Murray, Ayn Rand, Friedrich von Hayek, Mitlon Friedman and James M. Buchanan, arguing that they have misappropriated IQ is a to promote racist policies. He has been a noted critic of Canadian race scientist and psychologist J. Philippe Rushton.

References

External links
Faculty page

20th-century Canadian historians
Canadian psychologists
1946 births
Living people
21st-century Canadian historians
Academic staff of the University of Guelph
University of Illinois Urbana-Champaign alumni
Historians of race relations
Historians of psychology